Gregory Fenton Buckingham (July 29, 1945 – November 11, 1990) was an American competition swimmer, Olympic medalist, and former world record-holder in two events.

Buckingham was born in Riverside, California, and attended Menlo-Atherton High School in Atherton, California. He was one of two older brothers of Fleetwood Mac guitarist Lindsey Buckingham. Their father Morris ran a coffee plant near Palo Alto, California. Greg enrolled in Stanford University, and swam for the Stanford Indians swimming and diving team in National Collegiate Athletic Association (NCAA) competition.

At the 1968 Summer Olympics in Mexico City, he won a silver medal in the 200-meter individual medley, finishing second with a time of 2:13.0.  His second-place performance completed an American sweep of the event with Charlie Hickcox winning the gold medal (2:12.0) and John Ferris taking the bronze (2:13.3).  He also competed in the 400-meter individual medley and was judged to have finished fourth in the event final, even though his clock time was the same as the bronze medalist (4:51.4).

Buckingham died of a heart attack in 1990 at the age of 45.

See also
 List of Olympic medalists in swimming (men)
 List of Stanford University people
 World record progression 200 metres individual medley
 World record progression 400 metres individual medley

References

External links

 
 

1945 births
1990 deaths
American male medley swimmers
World record setters in swimming
Olympic silver medalists for the United States in swimming
Sportspeople from Riverside, California
Stanford Cardinal men's swimmers
Swimmers at the 1968 Summer Olympics
Medalists at the 1968 Summer Olympics
Lindsey Buckingham
20th-century American people